Bazelevs is a US-based production company founded by Hollywood director and producer Timur Bekmambetov. The company has been producing films such as Night Watch, Day Watch, Wanted, The Darkest Hour, Abraham Lincoln: Vampire Hunter and Hardcore Henry.

The company was involved in producing the animated film 9, which was nominated for Best Animated Film in 2010 at the Producers Guild of America Awards 2009.

In the summer of 2010 in Moscow, they filmed the Russo-American projects The Darkest Hour, in cooperation with 20th Century Fox, New Regency, Summit Entertainment and Kikoriki. Team Invincible in cooperation with Columbia Pictures, in the United States with Bekmambetov as a producer.

In 2015, the company have since released films in a new format titled "Screenlife" which each film is shot in the point-of-view of computer screens and smartphones. The first couple films released in that genre are Unfriended, Unfriended: Dark Web, Searching and Profile.

List of films produced by Bazelevs
 The Arena (2001) 
 Night Watch (2004)
 Day Watch (2006)
 The Irony of Fate: Continuation (2007)
 9 (2009; under Bazelevs Feature Animation) 
 Wanted (2008)
 Chernaya Molnya (2009)
 Apollo 18 (2011)
 Lucky Trouble (2011)
 Kikoriki (2011)
 Yolki (2010)
 The Darkest Hour (2011)
 Yolki 2 (2011)
 Abraham Lincoln: Vampire Hunter (2012)
 Gentelmen, Good Luck! (2012)
 The Snow Queen (2012)
 Yolki 3 (2013)
 Yolki 1914 (2014)
 Yolki 5 (2016)
 Yolki 6 (2017)
 Paws, Bones & Rock'n'roll (2015)
 He's a Dragon (2015)
 Hardcore Henry (2016)
 The Age of Pioneers (2017)
 Fur-trees Last (2018)
 The Current War (2019)
V2. Escape from Hell (2021)

Screenlife
 Unfriended (2015)
 Profile (2018)
 Unfriended: Dark Web (2018)
 Searching (2018)
 Missing (2023)

See also
 Central Partnership
 Blumhouse Productions

External links
 Official Website
 Bazelevs Company in IMDb

References 

Film production companies of Russia
Russian film studios
Companies based in Moscow
Russian brands